Saint Domninus of Fidenza is an Italian Catholic saint.  According to tradition, he died in 304 AD and was a native of Parma.  The cathedral at Fidenza (a town once called Borgo San Donnino) is dedicated to him.  The Hieronymian Martyrology commemorates Domninus, but does not include any further information about him, and his feast day is cited as occurring on October 9.  He is not commemorated in the martyrologies of Bede, Ado, Notker, or the Parvum Romanum.

His legend states that Domninus was Chamberlain to Emperor Maximian and keeper of the royal crown, and converted to Christianity, thereby incurring the emperor's wrath.  Pursued by imperial forces, he rode through Piacenza holding a cross.  He was caught and beheaded on the banks of the Stirone, outside of Fidenza, or the Via Aemilia.  It is recounted that Domninus picked up his severed head and placed it on the future site of the cathedral of San Donnino.

Veneration
His relics are enshrined in Fidenza Cathedral, adding some plausibility to the tradition that he suffered martyrdom in this region.  The ancient basilica at Fidenza, rebuilt in the 12th century, includes a sculpted frieze sub-divided into five scenes representing the life of the saint.  The sculptures are attributed to the school of Benedetto Antelami.

In art, Domninus is depicted in military attire, and holds the palm of martyrdom.  Domninus' cult was popular in Northern Italy. He has been from earliest times invoked against rabies; his Passio records that after water and wine was blessed and the saint invoked, anyone who drank this would be cured from rabies.

Other churches dedicated to San Donnino include:
San Donnino, Modena
San Donnino, Bologna
San Donnino Martire, Montecchio
San Donnino, Piacenza
San Donnino, Pisa

External links
Saints of October 9: Donnino (Domninus) 
San Donnino's stories
 San Donnino di Fidenza, martire

3rd-century births
304 deaths
Religious leaders from Parma
4th-century Christian martyrs
4th-century Romans
Cephalophores
Executed Italian people